Plectostylus is a genus of gastropods belonging to the subfamily Prestonellinae of the family Bothriembryontidae. 

The species of this genus are found in Southern America.

Species

Plectostylus broderipii 
Plectostylus chilensis 
Plectostylus coquimbensis 
Plectostylus coturnix 
Plectostylus elegans 
Plectostylus elongata 
Plectostylus granulosus 
Plectostylus mariae 
Plectostylus moestai 
Plectostylus ochsenii 
Plectostylus peruvianus 
Plectostylus prolatus 
Plectostylus punctulifer 
Plectostylus reflexus 
Synonyms
 Plectostylus apolinari Pilsbry, 1935: synonym of Plekocheilus episcopalis corticosus (G. B. Sowerby III, 1895) (junior synonym)
 Plectostylus delicatus Pilsbry, 1935: synonym of Plekocheilus delicatus (Pilsbry, 1935) (original combination)
 Plectostylus variegatus (L. Pfeiffer, 1842): synonym of Plectostylus broderipii (G. B. Sowerby I, 1832) (junior synonym)
 Plectostylus virgatus Pilsbry, 1935: synonym of Plekocheilus pulicarius (Reeve, 1848) (junior synonymy)

References

 Bank, R. A. (2017). Classification of the Recent terrestrial Gastropoda of the World. Last update: July 16th, 2017.

External links
 Beck, H. (1837). Index molluscorum praesentis aevi musei principis augustissimi Christiani Frederici. 1-124. Hafniae
 Breure, A. S. H. & Araujo, R. (2017). The Neotropical land snails (Mollusca, Gastropoda) collected by the “Comisión Científica del Pacífico.”. PeerJ. 5, e3065

Gastropods